Henryk Orfinger (born 28 June 1951, Warsaw) is a Polish entrepreneur. He is president of the management board at the cosmetic firm Dr. Irena Eris and holds several positions in Polish business institutions. Together with his wife, Irena Eris, he is listed within the 100 richest Poles in 2013 by the Polish edition of Forbes Magazine.

Biography
Orfinger graduated at the Warsaw University of Technology (Faculty of Transportation). 1983, with his wife, Irena Szołomicka-Orfinger, he founded the cosmetic company Dr. Irena Eris.

He holds several positions in non-government institutions. He is board member at the Polish Association of the Cosmetic Industry (Polski Związek Przemysłu Kosmetycznego) and chairman of the supervisory board of the Polish Confederation of Private Employers Lewiatan (Polska Konfederacja Pracodawców Prywatnych Lewiatan). He runs the jury for the Galeria Chwały Polskiej Ekonomii award.

References

Polish businesspeople
Warsaw University of Technology alumni
Commanders of the Order of Polonia Restituta
Living people
1951 births